Levente Zsolt Csik (born 29 April 1974) is a Romanian former footballer of Hungarian descent. Csik, a central or left-sided defender, has played in Germany since 1998, representing Borussia Fulda, Plauen, Dynamo Dresden and Borea Dresden. He is the younger brother of former Steaua București, Olimpia Satu Mare and Minerul Lupeni player Tiberiu Csik.

He spent two seasons playing in the 2. Bundesliga for Dynamo Dresden.

Honours
Olimpia Satu Mare
Liga II: 1997–98
Dynamo Dresden
NOFV-Oberliga: 2001–02
Saxony Cup: 2002–03, 2006–07

References

External links

Levente Csik at Fupa

1974 births
Living people
Association football defenders
Liga I players
2. Bundesliga players
Romanian footballers
Romanian sportspeople of Hungarian descent
FC Olimpia Satu Mare players
FC Brașov (1936) players
FC Dinamo București players
Dynamo Dresden players
Romanian expatriate footballers
Expatriate footballers in Germany
Romanian expatriate sportspeople in Germany
Sportspeople from Satu Mare